Jürg Schubiger (14 October 1936 – 15 September 2014) was a Swiss psychotherapist and writer of children's books. He won the Deutscher Jugendliteraturpreis (German Youth Literature Award) in 1996 for Als die Welt noch jung war.

For his "lasting contribution" as a children's writer Schubiger received the biennial Hans Christian Andersen Medal in 2008. The award conferred by the International Board on Books for Young People is the highest recognition available to a writer or illustrator of children's books.

Life
Schubiger was born in Zürich and raised in Winterthur, Switzerland. He graduated from the University of Zürich in German Studies, Psychology and Philosophy. He wrote his PhD thesis on Franz Kafka. He most recently lived in Zürich. Schubiger died in 2014, aged 77, four weeks and one day before his 78th birthday.

Works

Children's
 Dieser Hund heißt Himmel. Tag- und Nachtgeschichten. Illustrated by Klaus Steffens. Beltz & Gelberg, Weinheim 1978, 
 Das Löwengebrüll. Märchen, Geschichten. Beltz & Gelberg, Weinheim 1988, 
 Als die Welt noch jung war. Beltz & Gelberg, Weinheim 1995, ; Taschenbuch ebd. 2000, 
 When the World was New: Stories Annick Press Ltd., 1996, 
 Mutter, Vater, ich und sie. Erzählung. Beltz & Gelberg, Weinheim 1997, ; Taschenbuch ebd. 2001, 
 Wo ist das Meer? Geschichten. Beltz & Gelberg, Weinheim 2000, ; Taschenbuch ebd. 2003, 
 Seltsame Abenteuer des Don Quijote. Aufbau, Berlin 2003, 
 Die Geschichte von Wilhelm Tell. Nagel & Kimche, München 2003, ; DTV, München 2006, 
 Aller Anfang (with Franz Hohler). Beltz & Gelberg, Weinheim 2006, 
 Der weiße und der schwarze Bär. Hammer, Wuppertal 2007, 
 Zebra, Zecke, Zauberwort (with Isabel Pin). Hammer, Wuppertal 2009, 
 Der Wind hat Geburtstag. Hammer, Wuppertal 2010, 
 De Strubelpeter. Mundartfassung. Elfundzehn, Eglisau 2010,

Prose
 Barbara. Erzählung. Tschudy, St. Gallen 1956
 Guten Morgen. Eine Erzählung. Tschudy, St. Gallen 1958
 Die vorgezeigten Dinge. Geschichten. , Gümligen 1972, 
 Haus der Nonna: Eine Kindheit in Tessin (with Joli Schubiger-Cedraschi). Huber, Frauenfeld 1980; überarbeitete Neuausgabe: Limmat, Zürich 1996, 
 Unerwartet grün. Luchterhand, Darmstadt 1983, 
 Hin- und Hergeschichten (with Franz Hohler). Nagel & Kimche, Zürich 1986, ; Fischer Taschenbuch, Frankfurt am Main 1989, 
 Hinterlassene Schuhe. Novel. Nagel & Kimche, Zürich 1989, 
 Haller und Helen. Novel. Haymon, Innsbruck 2002, 
 Das Ausland. Hammer, Wuppertal 2003, 
 Du stehst in meinen Leben herum. Journal zu zweit (mit Renate Schubiger). , Oberhofen 2004, 
 Die kleine Liebe. Novel. Haymon, Innsbruck 2008,

References

External links

Schubiger's blog 

1936 births
2014 deaths
Swiss children's writers
Hans Christian Andersen Award for Writing winners
Psychotherapists
Writers from Zürich
People from Winterthur
University of Zurich alumni